The men's team tournament of the 2018 World Team Table Tennis Championships was held from 29 April to 6 May 2018. The draw for the tournament was held at 27 February 2018.

China defeated Germany in the final to capture the gold medal.

Championship division

Preliminary round

Group A

Group B

Group C

Group D

Knockout stage
The group winners of Groupd C and D were drawn, as well as the second and third placed teams. Same for the fourth, fifth and sixth placed teams.

Places 13–24

Places 1–12
All times are local (UTC+2).

Round of 16

Quarterfinals

Semifinals

Final

Second division

Preliminary round

Group E

Group F

Group G

Group H

Knockout stage
The group winners of Groupd G and H were drawn, as well as the second and third placed teams. Same for the fourth, fifth and sixth placed teams.

Places 37–48

Places 25–36

Third division

Preliminary round

Group I

Group J

Group K

Group L

Knockout stage
The group winners of Groupd K and L were drawn, as well as the second and third placed teams. Same for the fourth, fifth and sixth placed teams.

Places 61–72

Places 49–60

57th place bracket

References

2018 World Team Table Tennis Championships